is a Japanese professional footballer who plays as a defender for FC Ryukyu from 2023.

Career 

Takayasu begin first youth career with Mekaru FC, FC Ryukyu U-12, Yasuoka High School and Kokoku High School until he was graduation in 2018.

In June 2019, Takayasu begin first professional career with Zweigen Kanazawa from 2020 season, approved as a special designated player in September of the same year. On 24 November at same year, he debuted as professional career with his club at Final match against Omiya Ardija in J2 League Matchweek 42.

The opportunity to participate in the 2022 season was limited to 5 league games and On 21 October of the same year, he was announced that the contract would expire and the contract would not be renewed before the final game.

On 7 December at same year, Takayasu announcement officially transfer to J3 relegated club and former youth team, FC Ryukyu for upcoming 2023 season.

Career statistics 

Updated to the end 2022 season.

Club

References

External links

2001 births
Living people
Japanese footballers
Association football defenders
Zweigen Kanazawa players
FC Ryukyu players
J2 League players
J3 League players